Jangali or Jangli  may refer to:
 Jungle Movement of Gilan
 Jangli, Fars, a village in Fars Province, Iran
 Jangali, Kerman, a village in Kerman Province, Iran
 Jhangvi dialect, also known as Jangli, a Western Punjabi dialect